Krisztina Tóth (born 5 December 1967 in Budapest) is a Hungarian writer, poet and translator.

Selected works
Short stories, volumes of short stories, tales
 Vonalkód: tizenöt történet. Budapest: Magvető Kiadó, 2006
 Pixel. Budapest: Magvető Kiadó, 2011
 Akvárium. Budapest: Magvető Kiadó, 2013
Pillanatragasztó Budapest: Magvető Kiadó 2014
Párducpompa Budapest: Magvető Kiadó 2017
Fehér farkas Budapest: Magvető Kiadó 2019

Volumes of poetry
Őszi kabátlobogás 1989
Az árnyékember 1997 
Porhó 2001
Magas labda 2009
Felhőmesék 2017

Awards
Radnóti Prize (1990)
Gyula Illyés Prize (1994)
Tibor Déry Prize (1996)
Attila József Prize (2000)
István Vas Prize (2001)
Szépíró Prize (2005)
Sándor Márai Prize (2007)
Bárka Prize (2010)
Alföld Prize (2014)

References

1967 births
Living people
20th-century Hungarian poets
21st-century Hungarian poets
21st-century Hungarian women writers
20th-century Hungarian women writers
Attila József Prize recipients
Hungarian women poets
Writers from Budapest
Hungarian translators